Taşköprüzade or Taşköprülüzade Ahmet; variant Aḥmad ibn Muṣṭafá ibn Khalīl Ṭāshkubrīʹzādah (3 December 1494 – 16 April 1561) was an Ottoman historian-chronicler living during the reign of Suleiman the Magnificent, who was famous for his great biographic encyclopedia.

Life
The family was known as 'Taşköprülüler' because Ahmet's grandfather had been a professor at the Muzafferiye Madrasah of Hayreddin Halil in Taşköprü. Taşköprülüzade received his first education from his father and uncle Kemaleddin Kasım, in Ankara and Bursa, and completed his studies in Istanbul.  He was appointed to Oruç Pasha Madrasah in Dimetoka in 1525, and then to Hacı Hüseyinzade Madrasah in Istanbul. Later, he worked as a professor in various madrasas in Skopje and Edirne. He was appointed qadi (judge) of Bursa in 1545, and of İstanbul in 1551.  A sight problem led to an early retirement from public service in 1554, but he continued working on the publication of his writings.

Works
Al-Shaqāʾiq al-Nuʿmāniyya fī ʿUlamāʾ al-Dawla al-ʿUthmāniyya "The Anemones, on the Scholars of the Ottoman Era": (Arabic); biographical encyclopedia on the life and works of 552 scholars and sheikhs from the first Ottoman ruler Osman I to Suleyman I  (Suleiman the Magnificent), and is the primary source for the lives of scholars and scientists under the reign of Mehmed the Conqueror.
Şaka'ikü'n-Nu'maniye fi-Ulemai'd-Devletü'l-Osmaniye (Turkish ed.), or Şakaik-ı Nu'maniye ve zeyilleri (Turkish ed.).
 Miftāḥ al-Saʿāda  wa-miṣbāḥ al-Siyādah  – 'Key to Happiness and Lamp of Lordship'; encyclopedia in Arabic.  The great bibliographic encyclopedia Kaşf az-Zunūn of Kâtip Çelebi enlarged  on the Miftāḥ al-Saʿāda, and in turn became the basis of Arabic-Latin and French translations by the European orientalists Gustav Leberecht Flügel and Barthélemy d'Herbelot, published in several volumes with the titles Bibliographical and Encyclopaedic Lexicon and  Bibliothèque Orientale respectively. 
Miftâhü’s-Sa‘âde (Arabic), or Misbâh-üs-Siyâde fî Mevduât-ul-Ulûm, (Arabic); treats of the sciences of the period, and the works and writers of each branch.
Mevzuat ül-Ulum, or Mevḍuʿât-ül-Ulûm (Turkish ed.), 'Fields of Science'; (Turkish ed.); Translation by his son, Kemâleddîn Mehmed Efendi.
Al-Risālah fī al-Qaḍāʼ wa-al-Qadar (Traité du décret et de l'arrêt divins)
Osmanlı bilginleri (Istanbul, 2007); Sufi biography.
 Nawādir al-Akhbār fī Manāqib al-Akhyār

See also 
Taşköprü family

References 

1494 births
1561 deaths
16th-century biographers
16th-century encyclopedias
16th-century historians from the Ottoman Empire
16th-century jurists
Bibliographers
Encyclopedists from the Ottoman Empire
Political people from the Ottoman Empire
Hanafis
Maturidis